Year 1286 (MCCLXXXVI) was a common year starting on Tuesday (link will display the full calendar) of the Julian calendar.

Events 
 By place 

 Europe 
 January 6 – The 17-year-old Philip IV (the Fair) is crowned king of France at Reims. He settles the Aragonese conflict (see 1285), and intensifies his predecessors' efforts to reform and rationalize the administration of the realm. Philip persists in reforms, which strengthen the monarchy's position in Europe. The gabelle – a tax on salt in the form of a state monopoly – which will become immensely unpopular and grossly unequal, but persist until 1790.
 March 20 – Sultan Abu Yusuf Yaqub ibn Abd al-Haqq dies after a 28-year reign at Algeciras. He is succeeded by his son Abu Yaqub Yusuf an-Nasr, who becomes ruler of the Marinid Sultanate. Abu Yaqub makes a peace agreement with Muhammad II, Nasrid ruler of Granada, ceding all the towns previously occupied (except Algeciras and Tarifa). After confirming the peace with Castile on May 28, he leaves 3,000 men in the Peninsula.
 Old Prussians resettle in Samland and start an uprising against Teutonic rule (supported by the Principality of Rügen). The Prussians are defeated by the Teutonic Knights and forced to submit.
 The War of the Donkey is fought between the rival noble families of the Ghisi and the Sanudo, in the Duchy of the Archipelago in the Aegean Sea. 
 The Guelph Republic of Siena allows exiled Ghibelline rebels back into the city.

 England & Scotland 
 March 19 – King Alexander III dies in a fall from his horse at Kinghorn in Fife, leaving Queen Yolande of Dreux's unborn child and the 3-year-old Margaret (Maid of Norway) as heirs to the throne. After Alexander's death, Scotland is governed by the nobility and clergy, known collectively as the Guardians of Scotland. This sets the stage for the First War of Scottish Independence.
 June – King Edward I (Longshanks) and Queen Eleanor of Castile travel to France. There they pay homage to Philip IV (the Fair) and attend to other matters. Edward travels around in the duchy of Gascony and orders the rebuilding of fortifications in the region (between 1286 and 1289).

 Levant 
 June 4 – The 15-year-old Henry II sails from Cyprus and lands in Acre, but is refused entry into the citadel. There, he stays for six weeks in the palace to negotiate an agreement to take over the city from the Angevins.
 August 15 – Henry II is crowned king of Jerusalem at Tyre. After the ceremony, he returns to Acre for the festivities. A few weeks later, Henry returns to Cyprus and appoints his uncle Philip of Ibelin as regent (bailiff).

 Africa 
 Abu Hafs Umar I, ruler of the Hafsid Sultanate, takes control of Béjaïa and becomes a rival of the main Hafsid entity based in Tunis.<ref>Meynier, Gilbert (2010). L'Algérie cœur du Maghreb classique. De l'ouverture islamo-arabe au repli (658-1518). Paris: La Découverte;;. p. 158. .</ref>

 Asia 
 In the Lao kingdom of Muang Sua, King Panya Leng is overthrown in a coup d'état led by his son, Prince Panya Khamphong, which is likely to have been supported by the Mongol-led Yuan Dynasty in China.
 Kublai Khan makes plans for a final Mongol invasion of Japan, but aborts the preparations due to a lack of necessary resources.

 By topic 

 Art and Culture 
 March 7 – The Catholicon'', a religious Latin dictionary, is completed by John of Genoa.

Births 
 February 2 – Joan de Geneville, English noblewoman (d. 1356)
 March 8 – John III (the Good), English nobleman (d. 1341)
 June 30 – John de Warenne, English nobleman (d. 1347)
 September 4 – John de Mowbray, English nobleman (d. 1322)
 September 28 – Shōshi, Japanese empress consort (d. 1348)
 Alfonso de Castilla, Spanish nobleman and prince (d. 1291)
 Guy of Ibelin, Outremer nobleman and seneschal (d. 1308)
 Hōjō Mototoki, Japanese nobleman and regent (d. 1333)
 Hugh Despenser (the Younger), English nobleman (d. 1326)
 Ibn al-Akfani, Persian physician and encyclopedist (d. 1348)
 James Douglas, Scottish nobleman and general (d. 1330)
 John de Burgh, Irish nobleman and heir apparent (d. 1313)
 John Palaiologos, Byzantine prince and governor (d. 1307)
 Juana Núñez (Lady of Lara), Spanish noblewoman (d. 1351)
 Marco Cornaro, doge of Venice (House of Cornaro) (d. 1368)
 Odoric of Pordenone, Italian priest and missionary (d. 1331)
 William I (the Good), Dutch nobleman and knight (d. 1337)

Deaths 
 January 4 – Anna Komnene Doukaina, princess of Achaea
 January 5 – Zhenjin (or Chingkim), Mongol prince (b. 1243) 
 February 17 – Luca Belludi, Italian friar and religious leader 
 March 2 – Fujiwara no Ariko, Japanese empress (b. 1207)
 March 19 (or 18) – Alexander III, king of Scotland (b. 1241)
 March 20 – Abu Yusuf Yaqub ibn Abd al-Haqq, Marinid ruler 
 April 20 – Buluqhan Khatun (or Bulugan), Mongol princess 
 June 16 – Hugh de Balsham, English sub-prior and bishop
 July 5 (or 4) – Hartmann V, German nobleman and bishop  
 July 30 – Bar Hebraeus, Syrian scholar and bishop (b. 1226)
 September 22 – Mugaku Sogen, Chinese adviser (b. 1226)
 October 3 – Fujiwara no Tameuji, Japanese poet (b. 1222)
 October 8 – John I (the Red), English nobleman and knight 
 November 1 – Anchero Pantaléone, French cardinal (b. 1210)
 November 9 – Roger Northwode, English nobleman (b. 1230)
 November 22 – Eric V (Klipping), king of Denmark (b. 1249)
 December 15 – William de Warenne, English knight (b. 1256)
 Ambrose of Siena, Italian nobleman and missionary (b. 1220)
 Arlotto of Prato, Italian friar, Minister General and theologian
 Beatrice of Castile, daughter of Alfonso X (the Wise) (b. 1254)
 Bertram Morneweg, German merchant, traveler and councilor
 Ibn Sa'id al-Maghribi, Andalusian historian and writer (b. 1213)
 Jacob I (the Learned), Armenian cleric, catholicos and writer
 Pantaleone Giustinian, Latin cleric, papal legate and patriarch
 Pierre Coral, French monk, priest, abbot, historian and writer
 Reynold FitzPiers, English nobleman, High Sheriff and knight
 Sharaf al-Din Harun Juvayni (or Joveyni), Persian statesman 
 Simon II of Clermont, French nobleman and regent (b. 1210)
 Sophia of Denmark (Eriksdotter), queen of Sweden (b. 1241)
 William of Moerbeke, Flemish philosopher and writer (b. 1215)

References